Prisca (died 315) was the Empress of Rome (286–305) and wife of Emperor Diocletian. 

Nothing is known of her family background. 

According to the Latin writer Lactantius, Prisca and her daughter Valeria were "forced to be polluted" by sacrificing to the Roman gods during the Great Persecution of 303. Lactantius is, perhaps, implying that Prisca and Valeria were Christian or favorably disposed to Christianity.

When Diocletian retired to Spalatum in 305, Prisca stayed with her daughter, Galeria Valeria and son-in-law, Galerius in Thessalonica. When Galerius died in 311, Licinius was entrusted with the care of Prisca and her daughter Valeria. The two women, however, fled from Licinius to Maximinus Daia. After a short time, Valeria refused the marriage proposal of Maximinus, who arrested and confined her in Syria and confiscated her properties. At the death of Maximinus, Licinius had Prisca and her daughter killed.

See also
Saint Alexandra - Christian saint known in legends as Diocletian's wife

References

3rd-century Roman empresses
4th-century Roman empresses
People executed by the Roman Empire
Executed Roman empresses
Year of birth unknown
315 deaths
Diocletian
247 births